Diplostethus texanus is a species of click beetle in the family Elateridae, found in Texas, Oklahoma, and Arkansas.

References

External links

 

Elaterinae

Beetles described in 1853
Beetles of the United States